= Kranski Lake =

Lake in the state of Wisconsin, United States

- Kranchi Lake; Krancks Lake; Kraneks Lake
- Location within Wisconsin Location within the United States
- Location: Portage County, Wisconsin
- Coordinates: 44°35′59″N 89°22′14″W
- Type: lake
- Etymology: August Kranski
- Basin countries: United States
- Surface area: 6 acres (2.4 ha)
- Max. depth: 33 ft (10 m)
- Surface elevation: 1,150 ft (350 m)

Kranski Lake is a lake in the U.S. state of Wisconsin.

The lake is named after August Kranski, an early settler. Variant names are "Kranchi Lake", "Krancks Lake", and "Kraneks Lake". Kranski Lake is a 6 acres (2.4 ha) lake located in Portage County. It has a maximum depth of 33 feet (10 m). Fish include Panfish and Largemouth Bass.
